Duslyk (Duślıq) is a rural locality (a selo) and the administrative centre of Gafurovsky Selsoviet, Tuymazinsky District, Bashkortostan, Russia. The population was 2,145 as of 2010. There are 39 streets.

Geography 
Duslyk is located 10 km southeast of Tuymazy (the district's administrative centre) by road. Subkhankulovo is the nearest rural locality.

References 

Rural localities in Tuymazinsky District